Penfluridol (Semap, Micefal, Longoperidol) is a highly potent, first generation diphenylbutylpiperidine antipsychotic. It was discovered at Janssen Pharmaceutica in 1968. Related to other diphenylbutylpiperidine antipsychotics, pimozide and fluspirilene, penfluridol has an extremely long elimination half-life and its effects last for many days after single oral dose. Its antipsychotic potency, in terms of dose needed to produce comparable effects, is similar to both haloperidol and pimozide. It is only slightly sedative, but often causes extrapyramidal side-effects, such as akathisia, dyskinesiae and pseudo-Parkinsonism. Penfluridol is indicated for antipsychotic treatment of chronic schizophrenia and similar psychotic disorders, it is, however, like most typical antipsychotics, being increasingly replaced by the atypical antipsychotics. Due to its extremely long-lasting effects, it is often prescribed to be taken orally as tablets only once a week (q 7 days). The once-weekly dose is usually 10–60 mg. A 2006 systematic review examined the use of penfluridol for people with schizophrenia:

Synthesis

The Grignard reaction between Methyl 4-oxopiperidine-1-carboxylate [29976-54-3] (1) and 5-bromo-2-chlorobenzotrifluoride [445-01-2] (2) gives methyl 4-[4-chloro-3-(trifluoromethyl)phenyl]-4-hydroxypiperidine-1-carboxylate, CID:134990265 (3). Deprotection of the urethane gives 4-[4-Chloro-3-(trifluoromethyl)phenyl]-4-piperidinol [21928-50-7] (4). Lastly alkylation with 1,1'-(4-Chlorobutylidene)bis(4-fluorobenzene) [3312-04-7] (5) completed the synthesis of Penfluridol (6).

See also 
 Typical antipsychotic
 Diphenylbutylpiperidine
 Fluspirilene
 Pimozide
 Carpipramine (atypical antipsychotic)
 Clocapramine (atypical antipsychotic)

References

Further reading

 

4-Phenylpiperidines
Tertiary alcohols
Belgian inventions
Chloroarenes
1-(4,4-Bis(4-fluorophenyl)butyl)piperidines
Janssen Pharmaceutica
Trifluoromethyl compounds
Typical antipsychotics